Javier Rojas Iguaro (born 14 January 1996) is a Bolivian footballer who plays as a goalkeeper for Bolívar.

Club career
Rojas made his professional debut for Nacional Potosí in the Bolivian Primera División on 6 April 2018, starting in the home match against Royal Pari, which finished as a 2–2 draw.

International career
In May 2019, Rojas was included in Bolivia's senior squad for the 2019 Copa América in Brazil. He made his debut on 29 March 2021 in a friendly against Ecuador.

References

External links
 
 
 

1996 births
Living people
Sportspeople from Santa Cruz de la Sierra
Bolivian footballers
Bolivia youth international footballers
Bolivia under-20 international footballers
Bolivia international footballers
Association football goalkeepers
Club Bolívar players
Club Petrolero players
Nacional Potosí players
Bolivian Primera División players
2019 Copa América players
2021 Copa América players